Alison Townsend (born Pennsburg, Pennsylvania) is an American poet.

Life
She grew up in New York. She is Professor Emerita of English at the University of Wisconsin-Whitewater.

Her work has appeared in Calyx, Clackamas Literary Review, Fourth Genre, New Letters, The North American Review, and The Southern Review.

She is married and lives outside Madison, Wisconsin.

Awards
 2009 Pushcart Prize
 2008 Crab Orchard Award
 2004 Diner poetry contest

Works
 "Jane Morris Poses For Rossetti’s Proserpine"; "Demeter Faces Facts", Mudlark Poster No. 79, 2009
 "Spin", Rattle, July 2008

Poetry
 
 
 
 (Flume Press chapbook prize winner, 2007).

Anthologies

Essays
 
 "Faculty Essay: The World Outside My Window - balancing teaching and the creative life", ENVISION Magazine, Winter 2007

References

Year of birth missing (living people)
Living people
People from Pennsburg, Pennsylvania
University of Wisconsin–Whitewater faculty
Poets from New York (state)
Poets from Pennsylvania
Poets from Wisconsin
American women poets
American women academics
21st-century American women